Justice Drew may refer to:

E. Harris Drew, associate justice of the Florida Supreme Court
James B. Drew, chief justice of the Supreme Court of Pennsylvania